Chuck McGrady (born March 6, 1953) is a former Republican member of the North Carolina House of Representatives. He represented the 117th district from 2011 until 2020.

Life and career
McGrady was born in Baltimore, Maryland. He earned a B.A. from Rhodes College in 1975 and his J.D. Mercer University School of Law in 1978. From1978 to 1979, he taught law at Wayne State University Law School; after that he was a law clerk and then a corporate counsel until 1992, when he became Executive Director of the Environmental & Conservation Organization of Henderson County. He was an early leader of the Carolina Mountain Land Conservancy and served as President of the Sierra Club from 1998 to 2000. In 2009–10 he was Executive Director of the North Carolina Youth Camp Association, and he is director emeritus of Falling Creek Camp in Tuxedo, North Carolina.

Political career
He served on the council of the Village of Flat Rock from 1997 to 2001. In 2004 he was elected to the Henderson County Board of Commissioners, where he served until being elected to the North Carolina General Assembly in 2010, succeeding Carolyn Justus. He was the chairman of the House Appropriations and Alcoholic Beverage Control Committees for the 2019-20 session. In May 2019, McGrady announced that he will not seek re-election in 2020.

Electoral history

2018

2016

2014

2012

2010

2008

References

External links
Official website

Living people
1953 births
People from Baltimore
People from Henderson County, North Carolina
Rhodes College alumni
Mercer University alumni
Sierra Club presidents
21st-century American politicians
County commissioners in North Carolina
Republican Party members of the North Carolina House of Representatives